Mount Lawley is a Transperth railway station  from Perth railway station, in Western Australia, on the Midland Line and Airport line.

History
The station was built in 1907, and was demolished and rebuilt in 1968. Originally called Fenian's Crossing, the original station was positioned on the embankment between the subway and where the current station is located. The station was significantly upgraded in 2012, as part of Public Transport Authority works to bring a number of Perth's railway stations into line with the current accessibility and safety standards. The upgrade included a resurfacing of the platform and access ramp, a new platform shelter, as well as upgrades to handrails, lighting and signage.

Location
The railway's right of way lies between two major roads, Railway Parade and Whatley Crescent. There is one access point on each of these roads to the station, meeting on the western end of the platform at a ramp that leads down to the boarding area.

Rail services
Mount Lawley railway station is served by the Midland railway line on the Transperth network. This line goes between Midland railway station and Perth railway station. Since 10 October 2022 it is also served by the Airport line. The Airport line goes between High Wycombe station and Claremont station. It  Services on that line will go between Ellenbrook railway station and Perth railway station. Midland line trains stop at the station every 10 minutes during peak on weekdays, and every 15 minutes during the day outside peak every day of the year except Christmas Day. Trains are half-hourly or hourly at night time. The station saw 108,612 passengers in the 2013-14 financial year.

Bus routes

References

Railway stations in Perth, Western Australia
Midland line, Perth
Mount Lawley, Western Australia
Railway stations in Australia opened in 1907
Airport line, Perth